Yuriy Mihailovich Platonov (born 16 January 1948) is the mayor of Rybnitsa, an industrial town in Transnistria, Moldova, and the head of the Rybnitsa district administration.

References

Living people
1948 births
Place of birth missing (living people)
Mayors of places in Moldova